The 1942 Maine gubernatorial election took place on September 14, 1942. Incumbent Republican Governor Sumner Sewall was seeking a second term, and faced off against Democratic challenger George W. Lane, Jr.  Sewall was able to easily win his re-election.  This contest was the first gubernatorial election held after the entry of the United States into the second world war.

Results

Notes

1942
Gubernatorial
Maine
September 1942 events